Daphnella reeveana is a species of sea snail, a marine gastropod mollusk in the family Raphitomidae.

Description
The length of the shell varies between 7 mm and 9 mm.

The surface of this shell is almost microscopically decussated, the spiral sculpture being generally the strongest. The color of the shell is whitish, with light chestnut revolving lines, irregularly distributed, approximating or distant.

Distribution
This marine species occurs off Réunion, Mauritius and the Andaman Islands.

References

 Liu J.Y. [Ruiyu] (ed.). (2008). Checklist of marine biota of China seas. China Science Press. 1267 pp.

External links
 Pease W.H. (1868 ["1867"). Descriptions of marine Gasteropodæ, inhabiting Polynesia. American Journal of Conchology. 3(3): 211-22]
 
 Li B.-Q. [Baoquan & Li X.-Z. [Xinzheng] (2014) Report on the Raphitomidae Bellardi, 1875 (Mollusca: Gastropoda: Conoidea) from the China Seas. Journal of Natural History 48(17-18): 999-1025]

reeveana